Jean Saint Malo in French (died June 19, 1784), also known as Juan San Maló in Spanish, was the leader of a group of runaway enslaved Africans, known as Maroons, in Spanish Louisiana.

Saint Malo and his band escaped to a marshy area near Lake Borgne, with weapons obtained from free people of color and plantation enslaved. The maroons lived in the swamps east of New Orleans and made their headquarters at Bas du Fleuve, located along Lake Borgne in present-day St. Bernard Parish.

The Spanish colonial authorities led a campaign to suppress slave revolts and eliminate Maroon colonies in the region, capturing more than a hundred escaped slaves. In 1783, Col. Francisco Bouligny led an expedition against Bas du Fleuve, capturing 60 people, including Saint Malo.

Jean Saint Malo was condemned to death by hanging, on charges of murder. The execution was carried out by the alcalde Mario de Reggio on June 19, 1784, in front of St. Louis Cathedral next to the present-day  Jackson Square in New Orleans.

The Filipino community of Saint Malo, Louisiana, was named after him.

See also
List of slaves

References

General references
 "Juan San Maló" (1988). In A Dictionary of Louisiana Biography, Vol. II. New Orleans: Louisiana Historical Association. p. 714
 
 
 
 Medley, Keith Weldon (2000). "Black New Orleans." American Legacy Magazine (transcription)

Pre-statehood history of Louisiana
Rebel slaves
1784 deaths
People from New Orleans
People executed for murder
Spanish slaves
People executed by New Spain
Year of birth unknown
18th-century executions of American people
People executed by Spain by hanging
People of Colonial Spanish Louisiana
People from Galliano, Louisiana
18th-century slaves
18th-century rebels